Mount Bradley is a  mountain summit located in the Alaska Range, in Denali National Park and Preserve, in Alaska, United States. Despite its relatively low elevation, it is notable for its north face with nearly 5,000 feet of vertical sheer granite. The mountain was named by famed explorer Dr. Frederick Cook for John R. Bradley, a wealthy casino owner from Florida and one of Cook's financial sponsors.

Climate

Based on the Köppen climate classification, Mount Bradley is located in a subarctic climate zone with long, cold, snowy winters, and cool summers. Temperatures can drop below −20 °F with wind chill factors below −30 °F. The months May through June offer the most favorable weather for viewing and climbing.

See also
Mountain peaks of Alaska
Bradley Land

References

Gallery

External links
 NOAA weather: Talkeetna
 Localized weather: Mountain Forecast
 Flight through 747 Pass: YouTube (Mt. Bradley on right at 1:05 mark)

Alaska Range
Mountains of Matanuska-Susitna Borough, Alaska
Mountains of Denali National Park and Preserve
Mountains of Alaska
North American 2000 m summits